Bishwash Singh (born 22 March 1991) is an Indian cricketer. He made his first-class debut on 12 February 2020, for Manipur in the 2019–20 Ranji Trophy.

References

External links
 

1991 births
Living people
Indian cricketers
Manipur cricketers
Place of birth missing (living people)